This is a list of the main career statistics of Swedish former professional tennis player Mats Wilander whose career ran from 1980 until 1996.

Grand Slam finals

Singles: 11 (7 titles, 4 runner-ups)

Doubles: 3 (1 titles, 2 runner-ups)

Grand Prix year-end championships finals

Singles: 1 (0 titles, 1 runner-ups)

Doubles: 1 (0 titles, 1 runner-ups)

ATP career finals

Singles: 59 (33 titles, 26 runner-ups)

Doubles: 18 (7 titles, 11 runner-ups)

Singles performance timeline

Top 10 wins

References

External links
 
 
 
 

Tennis career statistics